Adam Feeney (born 7 March 1985) is a professional Australian tennis player.

Tennis career
Feeney's highest ATP singles ranking was World No. 248, which he reached in September 2007. His career high in doubles was World No. 100, which he reached in April 2008.

Adam Feeney was a successful junior, especially at doubles.  At the 2003 Wimbledon Championships, Feeney, along with fellow Australian Chris Guccione, made the final of the Boys' Doubles.  They lost the final to the Romanian pairing of Horia Tecău and Boys' Singles champion Florin Mergea.

Feeney made his first final in a professional tournament in March 2006 in the Australia F4 tournament in Bairnsdale, Victoria.  He lost to Konstantinos Economidis in the final. In August 2006 Feeney won his first pro tournament, the USA F21.  He defeated South African Kevin Anderson in the final. In September 2006, Feeney won the Australia F9 tournament, winning the final against Miles Armstrong. In July 2007, Feeney won the Great Britain F13 tournament, defeating Daniel King-Turner in the final.

Feeney has defeated many world class tennis players in his career.  For example, Feeney defeated 16-year-old Frenchman Gaël Monfils in the ITF Victorian Junior Championships 2003.

In 2006 he defeated American Sam Querrey, who became World No. 17 in 2011 in a Futures tournament in the United States. In 2008, Feeney defeated Bernard Tomic in an Australian Futures tournament.  He has also had victories over Horacio Zeballos, Karol Beck, Grigor Dimitrov, Kristian Pless, Mikhail Kukushkin and Dominik Hrbatý.

Career finals

Singles: 2 (6–9)

References

External links
 
 
 
 

1985 births
Living people
Australian male tennis players
People from Gosford
Tennis people from New South Wales